Malik ibn Awf was a companion of Muhammad, and a leader of the Hawazin tribe of Ta'if. Before he converted to Islam, he was one of the commanders in the Battle of Hunayn against the Muslims along with the Thaqif tribe. He later converted to Islam before Muhammad's death.

Muhammad's visit to Taif 
Malik ibn Awf criticized Muhammad when Muhammad came to Ta'if to spread Islam. First, Muhammad went to the leaders to spread Islam, but Awf and the other leaders condemned his teachings. Muhammad was later met by protesters who threw stuff at him.

Battle of Hunayn 
Awf participated in the Battle of Hunayn after the Conquest of Mecca. He ordered his army to shoot arrows at the Muslims before the battle started. This was successful for Malik because the Muslims started to flee. But soon Muhammad ordered Abbas ibn Abdul-Muttalib to call the Muslim army back. Abbas did so, and 100 Muslims came back to fight. After seeing those soldiers fight, the rest of the Muslim army also came back. This ruined the plan, and Malik faced a defeat. So he and his army retreated, and fled to Ta'if for the Siege of Ta'if. Muhammad and his army went to Ta'if and tried to capture them, but failed to do so. After the Conquest of Mecca, Awf became a Muslim.

full name 
Malik bin Awf bin Saad bin Rabia bin Waelah bin Dahman bin Nasr bin Saad bin Bakr bin Hawazen bin Mansour bin Ikrimah bin Khasfah bin Qais Aylan bin Mudar bin Nizar bin Maad bin Adnan bin Adad.

Al-Yarboui Al-Nasri Al-Saadi Al-Hawazni, and his nickname is Aba Ali, and it was said in his name that he is: Malik bin Abdullah bin Auf

his life 
He is a knight and a veteran poet from the people of Taif. We will shorten his mention before Islam and after:

in ignorance 
Malik is among the great knights, and a man would not be called a tractor until he had commanded a thousand fighters.  He was of high rank among his people, he fought a cultured man in the pre-Islamic era, and he used to not go out to them except that he was jealous of him until he struck him, and he often hits like the Day of Infinity.

It seems that Malik bin Auf was one of the rulers, the privileged and the opinion, so he stood as a preacher and warned the Banu Sulaym and forbid them from falling into a war with Zubyan, because of the harm and losses that it would cause them in the absence of those who support them.  Hawazin was far from you, and Tamim was full of you, and I prayed for you in it, Bakr bin Wael.  And from the news of Malik bin Auf in the pre-Islamic era that he fought Hudhail and other tribes.

The most ancient argument is that it is a day when someone like me is denied to someone like you that protects and hates.

His news in Islam 
The sources do not reveal much about aspects of his life in the pre-Islamic era, and do not mention the name of his wife and children and their number, except for his aunt, who is Umm Abdullah bint Abi Umayyah.  After the Battle of Hunayn, and what he would do in it.  Ibn Ishaq mentions that when Hawazin heard about the Messenger of God, peace be upon him, and what God had conquered from Mecca, and his intention to go to Taif to subjugate Hawazin and Thaqif, Malik bin Auf gathered Hawazin, and all of Thaqeef joined him, Bani Hilal, Bani Amr bin Amer and Bani Awf bin Aamer, and he wanted to fight  Muslims.  So he led the people with their money and their women to the fight, to put behind each man his family and money to fight on their behalf fiercely and valiantly.  And when the incident occurred, and the fighting intensified, Malik decried verses, and from what he said: I present the argument that a day when someone like me is denied, it protects and repeats If the row is wasted for a day and the anther, and then the groups are separated after the groups A battalion with poor eyesight has stabbed a stab that is nourished by sounding. When the battle was over and the Muslims were victorious, Malik bin Auf fled with the nobles of his people, and entered the fortress of Taif, so the Prophet, peace and blessings be upon him, said: “If a Muslim came to me, I would give him his family and money.”  He praised him with a few verses, including: I have neither seen nor heard of one among the people, all of them like the example of Muhammad. I will pay, so it will be given to the most generous of those who give me strength, and when you will, He will tell you about tomorrow And if the battalion stripped its fangs with Al-Samhri and struck every Muhannad It is as if it is a lion on its cubs in the midst of a puppy in an observatory. And when the Prophet heard it, he gave it to his family, returned his money to him, and singled him out for a hundred camels, as he did with those whose hearts were to be reconciled.

The story of his Islam 
Malik bin Auf al-Nasri al-Saad had led the Hawazin and Thaqif tribes to the Muslim war in Hunayn, so they were defeated and their money, family and offspring fell into the hands of the Muslims.

Ibn Ishaq said: The Messenger of God, peace and blessings be upon him, said to the delegation of Hawazin on the authority of Malik bin Auf al-Nasri, “What did he do?” They said: He is in Taif with Thaqeef. The Messenger of God, peace and blessings be upon him, said: (Tell Malik that if a Muslim comes to me, I will return his family and money to him, and give him a hundred camels). Malik came with that, so he went out to the Messenger of God, peace be upon him, from Taif, and he was Malik. So he ran until he came to his camel, where he ordered it to be imprisoned, so he rode it. So he followed the Messenger of God, may God bless him and grant him peace, and caught him in Al-Jaranah or in Mecca, and the Messenger of God, peace be upon him, returned his family and money to him, and gave him a hundred camels.

After Malik's Islam, the Prophet used him over his people and those with him and remained with them until the war of conquests took place, where he participated with his tribe in the Battle of Qadisiyah, and they had an interest in it, as he witnessed the conquest of the city of Damascus and resided there, and it became for him a house known as the House of Bani Nasr, which Malik first lodged  Damascus opened.

References 

Medieval military leaders
Companions of the Prophet
Hawazin
640 deaths